Mortagne-du-Nord is a commune in the Nord department in northern France. It lies on the border with Belgium, on the river Scheldt.

Heraldry

See also
Communes of the Nord department

References

Mortagnedunord